Teschen may refer to:

 Cieszyn, Poland, known as Teschen in German
 Český Těšín, Czech Republic, a city split off from Cieszyn in 1920
 Cieszyn Silesia, a geographic region spanning the Czech-Polish border
 Duchy of Teschen, a historical region in Central Europe
 Flag of the Duchy of Teschen
 Teschen disease, a viral disease named after the town
 Cieszyn Silesian dialect, a West Slavic dialect spoken in Cieszyn Silesia

See also

 History of Teschen